Alaimus primitivus is a species of nematode belonging to the family Alaimidae.

It is native to Europe.

References

Nematodes